Kotoko is a 2011 Japanese film by director Shinya Tsukamoto. It is based on an original story by J-pop artist Cocco, who stars in the film alongside Tsukamoto.

Plot
Suffering from double vision, a single mother (Cocco) tries to take care of her baby in the grip of terrifying hallucinations. Experiencing a nervous breakdown, she is deemed unfit to take care of her child and has it taken away from her. The only respite the mother has from her visions is when she sings. An award-winning novelist (Tsukamoto) overhears her singing whilst riding the bus and the pair subsequently develop a volatile relationship.

Cast

Cocco as Kotoko
Shinya Tsukamoto as Seitaro Tanaka

Release

Kotoko premiered at the 68th Venice International Film Festival where it won the Best Film award in the festival's Orizzonti section, the first Japanese film to do so.

The film was picked up for distribution in the UK by Third Window Films and was released on DVD and Blu-ray Disc on October 8, 2012.

References

External links
 

Kotoko review at subtitledonline.com
Review at Twitch

2011 films
Japanese drama films
Films directed by Shinya Tsukamoto
Films scored by Chu Ishikawa
2011 drama films
2010s Japanese films
2010s Japanese-language films